Ian Chaplin is an Australian jazz saxophonist. Chaplin, Scott Tinkler, Phillip Rex and Scott Lambie won the 1998 ARIA Award for Best Jazz Album with their album The Future In Today. The Ian Chaplin Quartet was nominated for same award in 1997 with Tjapangati.

Chaplin has been a member of Paul Grabowsky's Sextet, the Australian Art Orchestra, Decoy, and was a band member on Tonight Live with Steve Vizard.

Discography

Albums

Awards and nominations

ARIA Music Awards
The ARIA Music Awards is an annual awards ceremony that recognises excellence, innovation, and achievement across all genres of Australian music. They commenced in 1987. 

! 
|-
| 1997
| Tjapangati
|rowspan="2"| Best Jazz Album
| 
|rowspan="2"| 
|-
| 1998
| The Future In Today (as Chaplin, Tinkler, Rex, Lambie)
| 
|-

References

Australian musicians
Living people
1944 births